Aspasius Paternus (fl. 3rd century) was a Roman senator who was appointed consul twice.

Biography
Aspasius Paternus was a member of the Paterni, a prominent senatorial family. He was appointed consul suffect sometime around AD 246. In AD 257, Paternus was assigned as the Proconsular governor of Africa. His next appointment was as Praefectus urbi of Rome, a position he held from AD 264 – 266. In AD 268, Paternus was appointed consul prior, alongside Publius Licinius Egnatius Marinianus. He may have been among the supporters of the emperor Gallienus who died in late 268 during the purge of Gallienus’ partisans by the incoming emperor Claudius Gothicus.

References

Sources
 Christol, Michel, Essai sur l'évolution des carrières sénatoriales dans la seconde moitié du IIIe siècle ap. J.C. (1986)
 Martindale, J. R.; Jones, A. H. M, The Prosopography of the Later Roman Empire, Vol. I AD 260–395, Cambridge University Press (1971)

3rd-century Romans
Imperial Roman consuls
Roman governors of Africa
Urban prefects of Rome
Year of birth unknown
Year of death unknown